The sixth season of the science fiction television series The X-Files commenced airing on the Fox network in the United States on November 8, 1998, concluding on the same channel on May 16, 1999, and consisted of twenty-two episodes. The season continued from the 1998 feature film and focused heavily on FBI federal agents Fox Mulder (David Duchovny) and Dana Scully's (Gillian Anderson) separation from the X-Files Division and the demise of the Syndicate—a "shadow government" group attempting to cover up the existence of extraterrestrials—in the two-part episode "Two Fathers" and "One Son".

The season was the first to be filmed in Los Angeles, after production was moved from Vancouver, British Columbia, Canada. This move was done largely at the behest of Duchovny, who wished to be closer to his wife, Téa Leoni. Series creator Chris Carter opposed the move, although series director Kim Manners and Anderson approved of it, although to a less-vocal degree than Duchovny. The first half of the season also saw Mimi Rogers and Chris Owens' characters—Diana Fowley and Jeffrey Spender, respectively—become recurring characters.

Despite debuting with high viewing figures and ranking as the twelfth most watched television series during the 1998–99 television year, the season saw a slight decrease in ratings from the previous one, a trend that would continue until its final year. The season received mixed to positive reviews from television critics; some critics and fans were alienated by the show, due to the different tone taken by most standalone episodes after the move to Los Angeles. Rather than adhering to the previous style of "monsters of the week", they were often romantic, humorous, or a combination of both.

Plot overview 

In Washington, D.C., Agent Fox Mulder appears before an FBI panel regarding his experiences in Antarctica. Assistant Director Walter Skinner (Mitch Pileggi) tells Mulder that he and Scully have been denied reassignment to the division. Mulder goes to his former basement office, only to discover that Jeffrey Spender (Chris Owens) and Diana Fowley (Mimi Rogers) have been assigned to the X-Files. Going against orders, Mulder and Scully track down an escaped alien in Phoenix, Arizona while Cigarette Smoking Man (William B. Davis) gives chase. Mulder and Scully eventually discover that Cigarette Smoking Man has been using Gibson Praise to locate the creature. Scully brings Gibson to the hospital, where it is determined that he has the alien virus in his blood. Later, Skinner is mysteriously poisoned by a nanorobot infection. The culprit is revealed to be Alex Krycek (Nicholas Lea), a rogue FBI agent who formerly worked for the Syndicate, who continues to control the potentially debilitating nanotechnology in Skinner's system in order to achieve his goals.

Mulder and Scully later learn of reports of rebel aliens burning doctors who were working on Cassandra Spender (Veronica Cartwright), an alien abductee and mother of Jeffrey Spender. Skinner takes Spender to the scene, where Cassandra asks for Mulder. She informs Mulder and Scully that the aliens are here to destroy all life on Earth. She claims that a rebel force of aliens are mutilating their faces to prevent infection by the black oil. Cigarette Smoking Man reveals everything to Diana Fowley, who agrees to help him and betray Mulder. Cassandra later escapes from a hospital and arrives at Mulder's apartment, demanding that he shoot her because she is the embodiment of fifty years of work by the Syndicate—an alien-human hybrid that will trigger colonization if the aliens learn of her existence.

Fowley arrives and forcibly takes Mulder, Cassandra, and Scully to a CDC facility at Fort Marlene. There, Mulder runs into Marita Covarrubias (Laurie Holden). Marita tells Mulder that she was subjected to Syndicate-run black oil vaccine tests. Meanwhile, the Syndicate rendezvous at a checkpoint, preparing to be taken away by the Colonists, who are prepping for invasion. However, they are met by the alien rebels, who incinerate them all, including Cassandra; Cigarette Smoking Man and Fowley escape. Jeffrey Spender is then purportedly killed by Cigarette Smoking Man.

Several months later, a metallic artifact with inscriptions is discovered on the beach of Côte d'Ivoire in Africa. After Mulder examines rubbings of the object, he begins suffering from a headache, seemingly caused by the rubbings. Mulder's condition worsens, but he gains telepathic abilities. Chuck Burks (Bill Dow) tells them that the symbols on the artifact are Navajo. Eventually, Mulder passes into an aggravated delusional state and is placed under observation at a hospital. Hoping to find an answer, Scully rushes to Africa and finds the massive wreck of a large spacecraft partially buried in the beach.

Production

Background 
After five successful seasons of The X-Files, series creator Chris Carter wanted to tell the story of the series on a wider scale, which ultimately meant creating a feature film: the 1998 X-Files movie. The film grossed US$83,898,313 in the US and $105,278,110 abroad, giving a total worldwide gross of $189,176,423. In its opening weekend, showing at 2,629 theaters, it earned $30,138,758 which was 35.9% of its total gross. Initially, the fifth season of The X-Files was supposed to be the show's last. However, the series proved to be so lucrative for Fox that two additional seasons were ordered. Thus, the sixth season of the show began filming.

Development 

After five seasons in Vancouver, British Columbia, Canada, production of The X-Files moved to Los Angeles. "The Beginning" was the first episode of the series to be filmed in Los Angeles, California. The move was instigated by David Duchovny, who portrayed Mulder, in order to increase his opportunity to find movie work as well as to give him a chance to be nearer to his wife, Téa Leoni. Series creator Chris Carter opposed the move; others, like series director Kim Manners and Gillian Anderson supported the move but were less vocal than Duchovny. Fox network officials eventually made the decision to film in California. According to Andy Meisler, "The very first shot of the season, a long look directly into a bright sun shining on a barren desert, was designed to boldly announce the show's arrival in Southern California." As a result of the move, the episode featured a largely new group of crew members, hired by Carter, Frank Spotnitz and new co-executive producer Michael Watkins; this necessitated the show's new crewmembers spending five weeks, receiving, unpacking, and cataloging filming material from their Vancouver counterparts. Because of the shift from Vancouver to Los Angeles, some fans of the series were alienated. Many accused the show of "Hollywood-izing" the series by adding notable guest stars as well as making the plots simpler and more enjoyable for larger audiences. According to Space.com, a number of fans of the show specifically loved "the moody ambiance filming around Vancouver lent the series [during seasons 1–5]", which the sixth season reportedly lacked.

The move to Los Angeles also meant a drastic price increase for the series. Bruce Harwood, who played Lone Gunman John Fitzgerald Byers noted, "At the time, the exchange rate between Canadian and U.S. dollars was pretty dramatic. Somebody told me that the cost per episode doubled, even tripled, once they moved". In addition, the move further reduced the amount of expensive special effects the series was able to produce. Writer Vince Gilligan explained "everything in Los Angeles is more expensive across the board. […] It became apparent very quickly to me that we were no longer going to have things such as nuclear submarines descending through the ice and trains exploding in the middle of the woods".

Crew 
Series creator Chris Carter also served as executive producer and showrunner and wrote five episodes. Spotnitz was promoted to executive producer and wrote five episodes, and wrote the story for a further two episodes. Vince Gilligan was promoted to co-executive producer and wrote seven episodes. John Shiban was promoted to producer and wrote six episodes, and wrote the story for one other episode. New writers in the sixth season included David Amann who joined as executive story editor and wrote two episodes, and Jeffrey Bell who also wrote two episodes. Freelance episodes were written by Daniel Arkin and Jim Guttridge, and a further episode was written by Ken Hawryliw, who was the series' property master from 1993 to 1998. Duchovny also wrote his first episode solo, as he previously collaborated with various writers, including Chris Carter, on three other episodes. Other producers included producer Paul Rabwin, co-producer Lori Jo Nemhauser, and Bernadette Caulfield who joined as producer.

Producing-directors for the show included producer Rob Bowman, producer Manners, co-executive producer Michael Watkins, and consulting producer Daniel Sackheim, who together directed the bulk of the season's episodes. Manners directed seven episodes, Bowman directed six, Watkins directed three, and Sackheim directed one. Series creator Chris Carter directed two episodes, while cast member David Duchovny directed his first episode of the series. The remaining two episodes were directed by Peter Markle and Bryan Spicer.

Cast

Main cast

Starring 
 David Duchovny as Special Agent Fox Mulder
 Gillian Anderson as Special Agent Dana Scully

a Duchovny only contributes his voice to "Three of a Kind".

Also starring 
 Mitch Pileggi as Assistant Director Walter Skinner
 Chris Owens as Jeffrey Spender
 William B. Davis as Cigarette Smoking Man
 Nicholas Lea as Alex Krycek

Recurring cast

Guest cast

Episodes 
Episodes marked with a double dagger are episodes in the series' Alien Mythology arc.

Reception

Ratings 
The sixth season of The X-Files debuted with "The Beginning" on November 8, 1998. This episode earned a Nielsen rating of 11.9, with a 17 share, meaning that roughly 11.9 percent of all television-equipped households, and 17 percent of households watching television, were tuned in to the episode. The episode was viewed by 20.34 million people, a marked increase from the fifth season's finale, "The End", which was viewed by 18.76 million viewers. However, the debut marked a drastic decrease from the fifth season debut, "Redux", which garnered 27.34 million viewers. As the season continued, ratings continued to drop. The last episode of The X-Files to reach over 20 million viewers was "The Rain King", which attracted 21.24 million. The season hit its nadir with the eighteenth episode, "Milagro", which was viewed by 15.20 million viewers. The season finale, "Biogenesis", earned a Nielsen rating of 9.4, with a 14 share, and was viewed by 15.86 million viewers, marking a 22 percent drop in viewers when compared to the season premiere, and a 15.5 percent drop in viewers when compared to the previous season finale. The season ranked as the twelfth most watched television series during the 1998–1999 season, with an average of 16.39 million viewers.

Reviews 
The season received positive reviews from television critics. However some fans were alienated by the show in its sixth season, due to the different tone taken by most stand-alone episodes after the move to Los Angeles. Rather than adhering to the previous style of "monsters of the week", they were often romantic, humorous, or a combination of both. Several episodes—"Dreamland" and "The Rain King" in particular—were criticized for their reliance on humor or for their lighter stories. Fans on the internet began calling the less-scary episodes "X-Files Lite". Other episodes were derided for their mediocrity. Paula Vitaris from Cinefantastique called the episode "Alpha" a "run-of-the-mill monster-of-the-week episode". Robert Shearman and Lars Pearson, in their book Wanting to Believe: A Critical Guide to The X-Files, Millennium & The Lone Gunmen, called the episode "Trevor" "The X-Files at its most generic".

However, not all the sixth-season episodes were poorly received. The season's third episode, "Triangle" was largely lauded as a masterpiece by critics. The episode, which was shot in real time to look like it was filmed in four uninterrupted eleven-minute takes, was called a "classic" standalone episode and one of the "highlights of season six". The "Two Fathers"/"One Son" story-arc, which featured the destruction of the Syndicate, was called one "of the most coherent, [...] almost unbearably tense, hours in the series' run" by one critic. Finally, the Duchovny-penned "The Unnatural", which featured the story of an alien who fell in love with baseball, was praised by critics for its plot, directing, and originality. One review praised Duchovny's directing "excellence" while another referred to its ending as "heartbreaking".

Accolades 
The sixth season earned the series eight Primetime Emmy Award nominations, with one win. It won for Outstanding Makeup for a Series for the episodes "Two Fathers" and "One Son". Gillian Anderson received her fourth and final nomination for Outstanding Lead Actress in a Drama Series, and Veronica Cartwright received her second consecutive nomination for Outstanding Guest Actress in a Drama Series. Other nominations included Bill Roe for Outstanding Cinematography for a Series, Mark Snow for Outstanding Music Composition for a Series (Dramatic Underscore), Heather MacDougall for Outstanding Single Camera Picture Editing for a Series, Outstanding Art Direction for a Series, and Outstanding Sound Editing for a Series. This was the final season the series received Golden Globe nominations, with Gillian Anderson, David Duchovny and the series as a whole receiving nominations.

DVD release

Notes

References

Bibliography

External links 

 

 
1998 American television seasons
1999 American television seasons